Larkin Smith (17571813) was a Virginia officer, planter and politician who represented King and Queen County in the Virginia House of Delegates, and served as that body's Speaker from 1799 until 1802.

Early and family life

Born at Richahock plantation in King and Queen County to Mary Chew and her planter husband, John Smith. A member of the First Families of Virginia, he could trace his ancestors in the colony several generations back to immigrants from England.

Military service
Smith enlisted in November 1775 as a private in a company of minutemen. He was promoted to cadet in the 6th Virginia Regiment on February 10, 1776, then cornet of the 4th Regiment Continental Light Dragoons on August 1, 1777. His first officer's commission was issued on September 4, 1778 when he became a lieutenant. He was promoted to captain on April 1, 1780, and received land in southern Virginia as partial compensation for his patriotic service. Following the conflict, Smith became a member of the Society of the Cincinnati and continued in the Virginia militia, retiring as Colonel of the Regiment of Dragoons in 1807.

Career
Following the war, on September 30, 1784, Smith became one of the Justices of the Peace which collectively ruled his native King and Queen County.

King and Queen County voters elected Smith as their (part-time) representative in the Virginia House of Delegates in 1784-1785 and both re-elected him and failed to re-elect him many times. In the period June 7, 1794 until 1797 he was ineligible for legislative service because fellow legislators elected him as a member of the Governor's Privy Council which governed the Commonwealth's small executive branch. During their joint Privy Council service, he and Edmund Harrison (who would succeed him as speaker) on October 7, 1794 issued a report to the Governor on the condition of the State Treasury. Smith again won election to the Virginia House of Delegates in 1797, and was re-elected several times. Fellow delegates elected and re-elected him as their Speaker beginning in 1799, and he served until 1802.
Smith moved to Norfolk, Virginia and accepted the office of tax Collector for the Port of Norfolk, serving from October 12, 1807 until his death on September 28, 1813.

Personal life
Smith married twice. On April 21, 1781, he married Mary Eleanor Hill. Following her death, on May 25, 1804, Smith married Sophia Ann Tazewell Taliaferro (widow of Benjamin Taliaferro) at the home of her brother, Littleton Waller Tazewell, who would become Governor of Virginia in 1834-36. Her father was Judge Henry Tazewell of Williamsburg.

Death and legacy

Smith died in Fredericksburg, Virginia in 1813.

References

List of former Speakers of the House of Delegates, in the old House chamber in the Virginia State Capitol

1750s births
1813 deaths
Members of the Virginia House of Delegates
Speakers of the Virginia House of Delegates
People from King and Queen County, Virginia
Virginia colonial people